United Airlines Flight 859 was a Douglas DC-8, registration , on a scheduled passenger flight that crashed on landing at Stapleton International Airport in Denver, Colorado after departing from Omaha, Nebraska's Eppley Airfield on July 11, 1961. Eighteen people were killed, and 84 were injured.

The crash was caused by the failure of the two port engines to generate reverse thrust, which sent the aircraft off the runway. One of the plane's fuel tanks subsequently ruptured and ignited.

Accident 

The aircraft had suffered a hydraulic failure while en route from Omaha. The failure was not thought serious, however; the crew followed the checklists for hydraulic failure, and preparation was made for an expected routine landing. The plane touched down normally, but when the engines' thrust levers were moved to the reverse position, the reverser buckets for the engines on the port side failed to deploy correctly. That failure caused the left-side engines to continue generating forward thrust, while the right-side engines generated reverse thrust.

The plane immediately began to veer to the right as a result of the asymmetrical thrust. All tires blew out on the right main landing gear, after which the plane left the runway and hit a taxiway still under construction. The nose gear collapsed, and the airplane then slammed into several airport vehicles, including construction equipment. This ruptured a fuel tank on the right wing and caught fire, killing 18 (including one on the ground) and injuring 84 out of a total of 122 people aboard.

Investigation 
Carbon monoxide poisoning was the cause of death for 16 of the passengers, who were unable to evacuate. One elderly woman broke both ankles during the evacuation, and later died from shock.

The Civil Aeronautics Board (CAB) report stated that a contributing factor to the accident was the failure of the first officer to monitor the reverse thrust indicator lights when he applied reverse thrust.

The airport fire department was found to be deficient in its emergency equipment, but the fire crews were praised for their efforts.

See also

 1961 in aviation
 1961 in the United States
 Aviation accidents and incidents
 List of accidents and incidents involving commercial aircraft

References

External links
 

Airliner accidents and incidents in Colorado
Airliner accidents and incidents caused by mechanical failure
Aviation accidents and incidents in the United States in 1961
Accidents and incidents involving the Douglas DC-8
Disasters in Colorado
History of Denver
859
1961 in Colorado
July 1961 events in the United States